Erotylus histrio is a species of Pleasing Fungus Beetles in the family Erotylidae.

Description
Erotylus histrio can reach a length of about 1 inch. Head, antennae and thorax are black. Elytra are black, with irregular bands formed by yellowish spots.

Distribution
This species is present in French Guiana.

References

Beetles described in 1767
Taxa named by Johan Christian Fabricius
Erotylidae